Annickia affinis is small to medium sized tree that grows up to 30m tall, it belongs to the Annonaceae family. Also known as the African yellow wood, it is widely used in Central Africa and parts of West Africa in the treatment of various diseases. Both Annickia affinis and Annickia chlorantha are widely studied and sometimes credited with the name Enantia chrlorantha.

Description 
Straight, cylindrical trunk, about 80 cm in diameter. Bark, smooth, grey-brown - blackish. Leaf; petiole, 8-12 mm, leaf-blade, 3.5 x 27  cm long and 1.5 x 9 cm wide, narrowly elliptic to obovate, acuminate or acute at apex and cuneate at the base; glabrous upper surface, glossy dark green when fresh to grey/brown - black when dry; lower surface pubescent, pale green when fresh to greenish/brown - deep brown, short, simple, bifid or trifid hairs directed towards the apex.

Distribution 
Commonly occurs at altitudes between 50 - 650 meters in primary, secondary and degraded forests of the lower Guinea region up to Cabinda and Congo.

Uses 
Wood obtained from the species is used to make canoe paddles and furniture while the bark is suitable making straps for carrying baskets and as a material in building huts. Stem bark extracts are an important ingredient in decoctions to treat malaria and a host of other ailments. Dye obtained from the bark is also used for dyeing fibre and cotton.

References 

Flora of Nigeria
Flora of Cameroon
Flora of Angola
Annonaceae